1: The Collection is a greatest hits compilation album by Julio Iglesias, released in May 2014 on Sony Music.

It contains a selection of previously released recordings of love ballads. Some tracks were remastered.

Track listing

Charts

References 

2014 compilation albums
Julio Iglesias albums
Sony Music Latin compilation albums